The 1996 Crown Prince Cup was the 21st season of the Saudi premier football knockout tournament since its establishment in 1957. The main competition started on 15 April and concluded with the final on 7 June 1996.

Al-Hilal were the defending champions; however, they were eliminated in the round of 16 by Al-Tai.

In the final, Al-Shabab defeated Al-Nassr 3–0 to secure their second title. The final was held at the Youth Welfare Stadium in Jeddah. As winners of the tournament, Al-Shabab chose to participate in the 1997 Arab Cup Winners' Cup. Thus, as runners-up, Al-Nassr qualified for the 1997–98 Asian Cup Winners' Cup.

Qualifying rounds
All of the competing teams that are not members of the Premier League competed in the qualifying rounds to secure one of 4 available places in the Round of 16. First Division sides Al-Shoulla, Al-Wehda and Ohod and Second Division side Al-Tuhami qualified.

Bracket

Round of 16
The draw for the Round of 16 and Quarter-finals was held on 6 April 1996. The Round of 16 fixtures were played on 15, 16 & 17 April 1996. All times are local, AST (UTC+3).

Quarter-finals
The Quarter-finals fixtures were played on 19 April and 9 & 10 May 1996. All times are local, AST (UTC+3). Al-Riyadh's match was moved to 19 April due to their participation in the 1996 Arab Cup Winners' Cup.

Semi-finals
The draw for the Semi-finals was held on 11 May 1996. The Semi-finals fixtures were played on 23 & 26 May 1996. All times are local, AST (UTC+3). Al-Riyadh's match was postponed to 26 May due to their participation in the 1996 Arab Cup Winners' Cup.

Final
The 1996 Crown Prince Cup Final was played on 7 June 1996 at the Youth Welfare Stadium in Jeddah between Al-Nassr and Al-Shabab. This was the fourth Crown Prince Cup final to be held at the stadium. This was Al-Nassr's fourth final and Al-Shabab's fourth final as well. All times are local, AST (UTC+3).

Top goalscorers

References

External links
 Football competitions in Saudi Arabia 1995/96
 goalzz

Saudi Crown Prince Cup seasons
1996 domestic association football cups
Crown Prince Cup